Claudia Müller may refer to:

 Claudia Müller (footballer) (born 1974), German footballer
 Claudia Müller (politician) (born 1981), German politician

See also
 Claudia Müller-Ebeling (born 1956), German anthropologist and art historian